The Kinmen Military Headquarters of the Qing Dynasty is a museum in Jincheng Township, Kinmen County, Fujian Province, Republic of China.

History
The building was originally built as a study place for a scholar during the Ming dynasty under the name Cong Qing Xuan. It was then transformed into the Kinmen Military Headquarters during the rule of the Kangxi Emperor of the Qing dynasty when Commander of Kinmen relocated his office from Jinmencheng to Jincheng due to a situation change and loss of population in Jinmencheng.

After the establishment of the Republic of China in 1912, the office building had been used for several different purposes, from Kinmen County Government, Defense Headquarter, Fujian Provincial Government and Kinmen Political Committee during the Taiwan Strait Crisis. In 1995, the Kinmen County Police Department and Tentative County Assembly were relocated to other place.

Architecture
The building is a four-section house with three courtyards in between. The front courtyard spans over a wide area with a Leafy Banyan trees. At the back lies the centuries-old ceiba tree.

Gallery

See also
 Taiwan under Qing rule

References

Jincheng Township
Military and war museums in Taiwan
Museums in Kinmen County
Taiwan under Qing rule